Elasmias jaurffreti is a species of tropical tree-living air-breathing land snail, arboreal pulmonate gastropod mollusk in the family Achatinellidae. This species is endemic to Mauritius.

References

jaurffreti
Gastropods described in 1946
Molluscs of Mauritius
Taxonomy articles created by Polbot
Endemic fauna of Mauritius